Barbara Grant is an American businesswoman. She served in a variety of senior management positions at IBM for 21 years including vice president and General Manager in the Data Storage Division of Removable Media Storage Solutions. She continues to serve start-up and major corporations in a variety of capacities.

Education

Grant received her Bachelor of Science degree in Chemistry from Arizona State University and her Ph.D. in Organic Chemistry from Stanford University.

IBM

Grant was employed at IBM for 21 years where she held several executive positions. Her last position was Vice President and General Manager in the Data Storage Division.

Career accolades

Over her career she helped develop and introduce over 50 new products and received 8 patents. She has authored many publications in a variety of technology sectors. In 1996 she was elected to the inaugural group of the Women in Technology Hall of Fame.

Current board memberships
 Sacramento Area Regional Technology Alliance
 Integrated Materials, Inc.
 Agoura Technologies, Inc.
 PlanarMag, Inc. 
 Lumetric Lighting, Inc.
 Research Advisory Board - University of California, Davis
 Sacramento Area Region Technology Alliance (SARTA)

Recognition

1996 - Induction, Women in Technology International Hall of Fame, Women in Technology International

References

Businesspeople in technology
American women business executives
American business executives
20th-century American businesspeople
20th-century American businesswomen
IBM employees
Arizona State University alumni
Stanford University alumni
Year of birth missing (living people)
Living people
21st-century American women